Perfect Dark is a video game series developed by Rare and owned by Microsoft Studios. It debuted in 2000 with the Nintendo 64 first-person shooter Perfect Dark. The series follows Joanna Dark, an agent of the Carrington Institute agency, as she uncovers conspiracies by rival corporation dataDyne. In addition to video games, the series has expanded into other media, including novels and comics. These supplements to the video games have resulted in a significant development of the series' fictional universe.

Video games

Console games

Handheld games

Printed media

Novels

Comics

Soundtracks

References

Perfect Dark
Media lists by video games franchise
Mass media by franchise